Paul Kehoe (born 11 January 1973) is an Irish Fine Gael politician who has been a Teachta Dála (TD) for the Wexford constituency since 2002. He was appointed Chair of the Committee on Education, Further and Higher Education, Research, Innovation and Science in September 2020. He served as Minister of State at the Department of Defence from 2011 to 2020 and Government Chief Whip from 2011 to 2016.

Early and private life
Kehoe was born in Bree, County Wexford, in 1973. The son of Myles and Bernadette Kehoe, his father was a farmer and political activist. He was educated at St. Mary's CBS, Enniscorthy, and Kildalton Agricultural College, County Kilkenny. Kehoe is also a farmer. He is married to Brigid O'Connor, of Taghmon, and the couple have three children.

Political career
Kehoe was first elected to Dáil Éireann as a Fine Gael TD for the Wexford constituency at the 2002 general election. In June 2002, Enda Kenny became Leader of Fine Gael and Kehoe was appointed Fine Gael Spokesperson for Communications, Marine and Environment. He has also served as Fine Gael Assistant Chief Whip. He was re-elected at the 2007, 2011, 2016 and 2020 general elections.

On 9 March 2011, he was appointed as to be Minister of State at the Department of the Taoiseach, with special responsibility as Government Chief Whip, and Minister of State at the Department of Defence, by the coalition government of Fine Gael and the Labour Party led by Enda Kenny.

On 6 May 2016, he was appointed as Minister of State to the same departments by the new minority government of Fine Gael and Independents led by Enda Kenny. He did not continue as Government Chief Whip, but continued to attend government meetings, with increased duties as Minister of State where Kenny assigned himself as Minister for Defence. On 14 June 2017, he was appointed as Minister of State to the same departments by the new minority government of Fine Gael and Independents led by Leo Varadkar, where Varadkar similarly assigned himself as Minister for Defence.

During his term as Minister of State for Defence, Kehoe was the subject of controversy for comments he made about Naval Service vessels being docked, with two former Irish Naval Service officers calling on him to resign and stating he "smacks of a person who doesn't know how the military operates". Kehoe's home was targeted by protesters in April 2019.

During the 2020 general election, Kehoe's office was targeted by protestors from the Air Corps who encouraged voters to not give him any preference votes. He won 8.4% of the first preference votes, and was re-elected on the 11th count without reaching the quota.

Kehoe was not appointed to ministerial office in the coalition government formed on 27 June 2020 by Fianna Fáil, Fine Gael and the Green Party.

In 2021, Kehoe opposed a government proposal to give a €500 bonus to frontline workers, calling it "mad" and "crazy".

References

External links

Paul Kehoe's page on the Fine Gael website

 

1973 births
Living people
Fine Gael TDs
Irish farmers
Members of the 29th Dáil
Members of the 30th Dáil
Members of the 31st Dáil
Members of the 32nd Dáil
Members of the 33rd Dáil
Ministers of State of the 31st Dáil
Ministers of State of the 32nd Dáil
Politicians from County Wexford
Government Chief Whip (Ireland)